Aleksei Aleksandrovich Bayev (born 30 May 1993) is a Russian football player. He plays for FC Dynamo Vladivostok.

Club career
He made his debut in the Russian Professional Football League for FC Tambov on 24 September 2013 in a game against FC Metallurg-Oskol Stary Oskol.

He made his Russian Football National League debut for FC Tyumen on 22 July 2018 in a game against FC Nizhny Novgorod.

References

1993 births
People from Michurinsk
Sportspeople from Tambov Oblast
Living people
Russian footballers
Association football forwards
FC Vityaz Podolsk players
FC Tyumen players
FC Tambov players
Russian First League players
Russian Second League players
FC Veles Moscow players
FC Volgar Astrakhan players
FC Torpedo Vladimir players